Walter Dario Matthysse Sr. (born August 29, 1978) is an Argentine former professional boxer who competed from 2002 to 2009. He challenged for the IBF welterweight title in 2007 and at regional level held the WBO Latino welterweight title three times between 2004 and 2006. He is the older brother of former featherweight world champion, Edith Soledad Matthysse, and welterweight world champion of boxing, Lucas Matthysse.

Professional career

On July 14, 2007, Kermit Cintrón was dominant in his first title defense, knocking down the Argentine Matthysse three times on his way to a knockout victory twenty-nine seconds into the second round. Prior to this match, Matthysse had never been knocked down by any opponent, although he had suffered a tenth-round technical knockout loss in May 2006 at the hands of Paul Williams (the Cintrón-Matthysse bout was the main undercard fight of a WBO title bout between challenger Williams and incumbent Antonio Margarito).

Professional record

|- style="margin:0.5em auto; font-size:95%;"
| style="text-align:center;" colspan="8"|26 wins (25 knockouts), 5 losses (5 knockouts), 0 draws, 1 no contest
|-  style="text-align:center; margin:0.5em auto; font-size:95%; background:#e3e3e3;"
|  style="border-style:none none solid solid; "|Res.
|  style="border-style:none none solid solid; "|Record
|  style="border-style:none none solid solid; "|Opponent
|  style="border-style:none none solid solid; "|Type
|  style="border-style:none none solid solid; "|Rd., Time
|  style="border-style:none none solid solid; "|Date
|  style="border-style:none none solid solid; "|Location
|  style="border-style:none none solid solid; "|Notes
|- align=center
|Loss || 26–5 ||align=left| Oscar Daniel Veliz
|
|
|
|align=left|
|align=left|
|- align=center
|Loss || 26–4 ||align=left| Alex Bunema
|
|
|
|align=left|  
|align=left|
|- align=center
|Loss || 26–3 ||align=left| Sebastian Andres Lujan
||| 10  ||  
|align=left| 
|align=left|
|- align=center
|Loss || 26–2 ||align=left| Kermit Cintron
|||||
|align=left|
|align=left|
|- align=center
|Win || 26–1  ||align=left| Jorge Dario David Gomez
||| 2  ||  ||align=left|
|align=left|
|- align=center
|Loss || 25–1 ||align=left| Paul Williams
|
|
|
|align=left|
|align=left|
|- align=center
|Win || 25–0 || align=left| Juan Carlos Alderete
||| 1  || 
|align=left|
|align=left|
|- align=center
|Win || 24–0 ||align=left| Xavier Toliver
||| 1  ||  ||align=left|
|align=left|
|- align=center
|style="background:#ddd;"|NC || 23–0 ||align=left| Roberto Hernan Reuque
| || 2  ||  ||align=left|
|align=left|
|- align=center
|Win || 23–0 ||align=left| Juan Italo Meza
| || 6  || 
|align=left|
|align=left|
|- align=center
|Win || 22–0 ||align=left| Juan Carlos Villagra
| || 8  || 
|align=left|
|align=left|
|- align=center
|Win || 21–0 ||align=left| Raul Martinez
| || 1  || 
|align=left|
|align=left|
|- align=center
|Win || 20–0 ||align=left| Silvio Walter Rojas
| || 2  || 
|align=left|
|align=left|
|- align=center
|Win || 19–0 ||align=left| Carlos Adan Jerez
| || 8  || 
|align=left|
|align=left|
|- align=center
|Win || 18–0 ||align=left| Facundo David Tolosa
| || 2  || 
|align=left|
|align=left|
|- align=center
|Win || 17–0 ||align=left| Hector Ignacio Avila
| || 2  || 
|align=left|
|align=left|
|- align=center
|Win || 16–0 ||align=left| Ruben Dario Oliva
| || 2  || 
|align=left|
|align=left|
|- align=center
|Win || 15–0 ||align=left| Jorge Dario David Gomez
| || 2  || 
|align=left|
|align=left|
|- align=center
|Win || 14–0 ||align=left| Javier Alejandro Blanco
| || 2  || 
|align=left|
|align=left|
|- align=center
|Win || 13–0 ||align=left| Marcos Carlos Alegre
| || 1  || 
|align=left|
|align=left|
|- align=center
|Win || 12–0 ||align=left| Lorenzo Marquez
| || 3  || 
|align=left|
|align=left|
|- align=center
|Win || 11–0 ||align=left| Carlos Ignacio Molinas
| || 3  || 
|align=left|
|align=left|
|- align=center
|Win || 10–0 ||align=left| Eduardo Jesus Oscar Rojas
| || 3  || 
|align=left|
|align=left|
|- align=center

References

External links

1978 births
Living people
Light-middleweight boxers
Argentine male boxers
Welterweight boxers